The Climate Pledge Fund is a division of Amazon, set up to develop and manage investments in the climate technology space, as part of its Climate Pledge initiative. It is a corporate venture capital fund.

History 
The Climate Pledge Fund makes investments into early-stage companies focused on decarbonizing or sustainable technologies and services. The fund is part of Amazon's Climate Pledge initiative with climate advocacy group Global Optimism. It was funded with an initial $2 billion in June 2020.

This corporate venture capital fund is distinct from the following sustainability-related organizations affiliated with Amazon:
 the $10 billion Bezos Earth Fund, which provides philanthropic grants to environmental organizations globally
 the $100 million Right Now Climate Fund, which provides philanthropic contributions to local and regional non-governmental organizations in Europe
 the $1B corporate venture capital fund, Amazon Industrial Innovation Fund, which will invest in the industrial sector

People 
As of December 2021, Matt Peterson, Director, Corporate New Initiatives, and Kara Hurst, Vice President and Head of Sustainability, lead the fund.

Notable Investments

2020 investments 

 Redwood Materials - process & technologies for recycling lithium-ion batteries and producing battery materials from recovered elements
 Rivian - electric vehicle automaker
 Turntide Technologies - optimal efficiency motor technologies for building controls (e.g. ventilation, lighting)
 CarbonCure Technologies - Lower carbon concrete manufacturer
 Pachama - carbon offset verification technology
 ZeroAvia - share-haul hydrogen-electric aircraft

2021 investments 

 BETA Technologies - Electric vertical aircraft manufacturer
 ION Energy - smart battery management platform for automotive
 CMC Machinery - design and manufacture of custom-sized boxes
 Resilient Power - electric vehicle recharging infrastructure
 Infinium - Ultra low carbon fuels for global transport
 Hippo Harvest - controlled environment agriculture
 Amogy - zero-emissions ammonia-based fuel for heavy-duty transportation, starting with marine shipping

2022 investments 
 Ambient Photonics - high power density solar cells for smart home devices and consumer electronics.

Other climate tech investors 

 Microsoft's Climate Innovation Fund
 Breakthrough Energy Ventures
 Elemental Excelerator's Earthshot Ventures Fund
 VertueLab's Climate Impact Fund
 Decarbon8-US

External links 

 Amazon's Sustainability Website
 The Climate Pledge's Website
 SOSV Climate Tech Summit interview with Matt Peterson & Jason Thompson, CFO, Redwood Materials (video)

References 

Amazon (company)